Epfig station (French: Gare d'Epfig) is a railway station serving the commune of Epfig, Bas-Rhin department, France. The station is owned and operated by SNCF, in the TER Grand Est regional rail network and is served by TER trains.

It is located at kilometric point (KP) 12.51 on the Sélestat-Saverne railway between the stations of Dambach-la-Ville and Eichhoffen.

History 
According to the SNCF, the station saw 22 409 passengers in 2018.

Services 
The station is frequented by TER Grand Est train services between Strasbourg and Sélestat.

References 

Railway stations in Bas-Rhin